Worth Ave. Group is a consumer electronics insurance provider based in Stillwater, Oklahoma. The company is best known for offering iPhone insurance policies. Worth Ave. Group was formed from National Student Services Inc., one of the nation's largest insurers of college students’ personal property. Worth Ave. Group's insurance policies are underwritten by Hanover Insurance Group. The company was founded in 1972.

The company also researches and provides data to the public on smartphone and technology gadget usage, including insurance and usage rates.

Awards 

 2014 Bronze Stevie Award by American Business Awards
 The Fantastic New and Cheaper Way to get Product Warranties for Your Expensive Electronic Devices by Good Morning America
 Options to Keep You Mobile by KFOR4

References

External links
Gadget insurance infographic
 
 Awards

Insurance companies of the United States
Financial services companies established in 1972
Companies based in Oklahoma